H2O Audio is a company based in San Diego, California, which develops accessories for portable media players.  In 2008, it was notable for being one of the top 500 fastest growing companies in the United States.  H2O Audio has an international distribution system covering over 30 countries, including the United Kingdom, Australia, Mexico and Japan.

They hold various US patents, including the patent for the Commander Scroll Wheel Technology which allows for control of a touch sensitive rotatable wheel (like is found on the larger iPods) in conjunction with a fully waterproof hard case. They also make the only housing with attached speakers that allows iPods and iPhones to function and be controlled underwater up to depths of 300 feet.

H2O Audio's motto is "Your Sport, Your Music", and their sponsored athletes include Michael Phelps, Natalie Coughlin, Laird Hamilton, and triathletes Greg and Laura Bennett.

History
H2O Audio was started as a graduate student project at San Diego State University by a SCUBA diver who wanted to take music with him while diving; hence the company was originally named Diver Entertainment. In 2002, the first patents were approved, followed by the development of waterproof technologies in 2003. By 2004, the first underwater SCUBA product was shipped. In 2005, the company moved into developing waterproof headphones and cases for MP3 players, including iPods. 2007 was the year Olympic swimmer Natalie Coughlin was brought on as the first official H2O Audio Ambassador, and in 2008, big wave surfer Laird Hamilton was also named an official H2O Audio Ambassador. Currently, Laird Hamilton has his own signature version of Surge Headphones. In 2009, Olympic swimmer Michael Phelps also became an official ambassador of the brand, along with triathletes Greg and Laura Bennett.

References

External links
 
H2O Audio Surge SX10 Review

Further reading
 
 

Portable media players